Iolo is a diminutive of Iorwerth, a Welsh name. It may refer to:

Iolo Goch (1320 – 1398), Welsh bard
Iolo Morganwg (1747 – 1826), Welsh poet, antiquarian, and literary forger
Iolo Ceredig Jones (born 1947), Welsh chess player
Iolo Williams (born 1962), Welsh television presenter
Iolo FitzOwen, character in the computer game series Ultima

Welsh masculine given names